Caloptilia magnoliae is a moth of the family Gracillariidae. It is known from the islands of Hokkaidō and Honshū in Japan and from Korea.

The wingspan is 14.5–15.5 mm.

The larvae feed on Magnolia heptapetala, Magnolia hypoleuca and Magnolia kobus. They probably mine the leaves of their host plant. It is gregarious in the larval stage, in young instars five to twenty larvae live together in a large blotch mine, and in the fourth and fifth instars in a cigarette-formed leaf-roll.

References

magnoliae
Moths of Asia
Moths described in 1966